Sheffield United Football Club is a professional football club in Sheffield, South Yorkshire, England, which competes in the . They are nicknamed "the Blades" due to Sheffield's history of cutlery production. The team have played home games at Bramall Lane since their formation. For most of the club's history, United have played in red and white striped shirts with black shorts. Their main rivals are Sheffield Wednesday, with whom they contest the Steel City derby.
 
The club was formed as an offshoot of Sheffield United Cricket Club in 1889. Following strong performances in the Midland League and Northern League, they were invited to become founder members of the Football League Second Division in 1892. They won promotion to the First Division at the end of the 1892–93 season and went on to be crowned English football champions in 1897–98. United went on to win the FA Cup on four occasions: 1899, 1902, 1915 and 1925; and were beaten finalists in 1901. They spent 41 years in the top-flight before being relegated in 1934. United finished as FA Cup runners-up in 1936 and were promoted as runners-up of the Second Division in 1938–39.

United won the Second Division title in 1952–53, following relegation in 1949. They spent the next three decades between the First and Second Divisions, winning promotions in 1960–61 and 1970–71 after relegations in 1956 and 1968. However, a slow decline saw the club drop to the fourth tier by 1982, though they would win an immediate promotion as Fourth Division champions in 1981–82; this achievement meant that Sheffield United are one of only five sides to have won all four professional divisions of English football. Promoted in 1983–84, they recovered from relegation in 1988 to win consecutive promotions into the top-flight at the end of the 1989–90 campaign.

Sheffield United were founder member of the Premier League in the 1992–93 season, during which they scored the first ever goal of the competition. They were relegated in 1994 and after losing play-off finals in 1997 and 2003, the club finally regained their Premier League status at the end of the 2005–06 campaign under the stewardship of manager Neil Warnock. However, United were relegated the following year and dropped into League One in 2011. They spent six seasons in the third tier, losing in three play-offs campaigns, before manager Chris Wilder led the club to promotion as champions in 2016–17. Promotion  to the Premier League followed in 2018–19, though they were returned to the Championship in 2021.

History

Formation and glory years (1888–1975)

The club was formed by members of the Sheffield United Cricket Club, formed in 1854 and the first English sports club to use 'United' in its name. Sheffield United's predominant nickname is "The Blades", a reference to Sheffield's status as the major producer of cutlery in the United Kingdom. United's original nickname was in fact "The Cutlers" from 1889–1912. City rivals Wednesday held the nickname "The Blades" in their early years, however in 1907 Wednesday officially became "The Owls", in reference to their new ground in Owlerton, and United would later claim "The Blades" nickname for themselves.

Sheffield United officially formed on 22 March 1889 at the Adelphi Hotel, Sheffield (now the site of the Crucible Theatre) by the President of the Cricket Club, Sir Charles Clegg. The Wednesday had moved from Bramall Lane to their own ground at Olive Grove after a dispute over gate receipts and the tenants of Bramall Lane needed to create a new team to generate income. Sir Charles Clegg was incidentally also the president of The Wednesday.

Undoubtedly United's heyday was the 30-year period from 1895–1925, when they were champions of England in 1897–98 and runners-up in 1896–97 and 1899–1900, and FA Cup winners in 1899, 1902, 1915 and 1925. United have not won a trophy since 1925, bar those associated with promotion from lower leagues, their best performances in the cup competitions being several semi-final appearances in the FA Cup and League Cup.

Fall from grace and brief revival (1975–1994)
Their darkest days came between 1975 and 1981. After finishing sixth in the First Division at the end of the 1974–75 season, they were relegated to the Second Division the following season, and three years after that setback they fell into the Third Division. They reached an absolute low in 1981 when they were relegated to the Fourth Division, but were champions in their first season in the league's basement division and two years afterwards they won promotion to the Second Division.

They fell back into the Third Division in 1988, but new manager Dave Bassett masterminded a quick revival which launched the Blades towards one of the most successful eras in their history. Successive promotions in the aftermath of the 1988 relegation saw them return to the First Division in 1990 after a 14-year exile. They survived at this level for four seasons (being founder members of the new Premier League in 1992 after peaking with a ninth-place finish in the last season of the old First Division) and reached an FA Cup semi-final in the 1992–93 season before being relegated in 1994.

Financial trouble and fall to League One (1994–2013)
They remained outside the top flight for the next 12 years, although they qualified for the play-offs under Bassett's successor Howard Kendall in 1997 and caretaker manager Steve Thompson in 1998. They were struggling at the wrong end of Division One when Neil Warnock was appointed manager in December 1999, and a financial crisis was preventing the club from being able to boost their squad, but in 2002–03 they enjoyed their most successful season for a decade, reaching the semi-finals of both domestic cups and also reaching the Division One play-off final, where they were beaten 3–0 by Wolverhampton Wanderers. Three years later, however, Warnock delivered a Premier League return as the Blades finished runners-up in the re-branded Championship. They lasted just one season back amongst the elite, before being relegated from the Premier League amidst the controversy surrounding Carlos Tevez, the player who was controversially signed by West Ham United and whose performances played a big part in their remarkable escape from relegation. Neil Warnock resigned as manager after the Blades went down. The team also purchased Chinese club Chengdu Wuniu in 2006, and redesigned the club crest in the style of the Sheffield United badge and renamed the team "Chengdu Blades". The team were dissolved in 2015.

The club struggled to come to terms with life back in the Championship, with a spiralling wage bill not being matched by the quality of the players brought in, and a succession of managers within a short period of time. The Blades reached the Championship playoff final in 2009 under Kevin Blackwell, but a period of decline then set in. The 2010–11 season proved disastrous, with the club employing three different managers in the span of a season, which ultimately ended in relegation to League One under Micky Adams, meaning they would play in the third tier of English football for the first time since 1989. United qualified for the League One play-offs in 2011–12 and 2012–13 but lost in the final and semi-final respectively.

Saudi Takeover and return to the top flight (2013–present)

In September 2013, Abdullah bin Musaid Al Saud of the House of Saud had bought a 50 per cent stake in United's parent company "Blades Leisure Ltd". Both parties, at that time, agreed to include a "roulette notice" mechanism to end their arrangement when they no longer wished to work together. In 2014, United reached the FA Cup semi-final at Wembley but lost 5–3 to Hull City. In 2014–15, the team reached the quarter-finals of the FA Cup and semi-final of the Football League Cup. United secured promotion back to the second tier in 2016–17 under the management of lifelong United fan and former player Chris Wilder, winning the League One title with 100 points. In late 2017, co-owner Kevin McCabe served a roulette notice on Prince Abdullah, giving him the option to sell his 50 per cent at £5 million or buy McCabe's 50 per cent for the same price. Prince Abdullah chose to buy but McCabe refused to sell, a decision that ended up before the High Court of Justice.

In the 2018–19 season, Sheffield United achieved automatic promotion to the Premier League. United's first season back in the Premier League, despite being tipped by many for relegation, produced a ninth-place finish. Despite this, ownership disputes between Prince Abdullah and McCabe continued. In September 2019, after 20 months of litigation, the High Court issued its judgment, requiring McCabe's company to sell its shares in United. McCabe sought permission to appeal from the High Court and Court of Appeal but both appeals were rejected. As a result, Prince Abdullah became the sole beneficial owner of the club. In the 2020–21 season, the club made a very poor start to the season, taking just one win in their opening eighteen matches. Wilder left the club by mutual consent in March 2021. He was replaced by Paul Heckingbottom as caretaker manager, who could not prevent relegation at the end of the season. In May 2021, the club appointed Slaviša Jokanović as the new manager, making him the first overseas manager the club's history. However, Jokanović was dismissed in November after a poor start to the season and Heckingbottom was reappointed as manager, this time on a permanent basis.

Kits, colours and crest

Sheffield United have played in red and white stripes for most of their history, but began playing in white shirts and blue shorts. They briefly played in narrow red stripes for the 1890–91 season, before returning to all-white the following year. The stripes returned in the 1892–93 season, with black shorts replacing the blue in 1904. The shirts remained largely unchanged until collars were first removed in 1955, replaced by V-necks until the 1966–67 season (when white socks were also used), and from here on the neck style varied.

The traditional red and white stripes remained until the 1974–75 season, when elements of black were added, until the 1979–81 and 82 season kit. This was white with a red breast, and with thin stripes down either side, and was created to accommodate the logo of the club's principal sponsor, Cantor's, a local furniture shop. This was to be replaced by a striped kit, with the sponsor Bentley's (1981–82) and Renault (1982–83) written vertically down a white stripe over the left-hand side. Their kits continued to feature striped shirts, albeit with various aids to accommodate their sponsors, including a yellow square for Laver from 1988–92 (the 1990–92 shirt also featured narrow black stripes through each white stripe) and a black hoop, also for Laver in the 1994–95 season. Then came the diamond kit, which was so badly received that the club reverted to stripes the following season. Since then, red and white stripes and black socks with varying trim have been the order of the day, with black shorts for all but the 2002–05 seasons, when white and then red were tried. The club also every few seasons opt to put thin black stripes between the red and white stripes. Sheffield United's home colours were the inspiration for the kit of Irish club, Derry City. In 1934, Derry City adopted the stripes, while Billy Gillespie was manager of the club, in recognition of Gillespie's achievements at Sheffield United.

The first time a crest appeared on the shirt was in the 1891–92 season, when a red crest appeared on the white shirt, but this disappeared the following season. United used the city of Sheffield's coat of arms from 1965–77, when a new crest was used, introduced by former manager Jimmy Sirrel, but designed apparently over 20 years previously by former player Jimmy Hagan. This consisted of two white crossed swords, or blades, the club's nickname, with a Yorkshire Rose above, on a black background. This is surrounded by a red ring with "Sheffield United F.C." written around the top and "1889", the year the club was founded, underneath. This has been altered very slightly a few times, with a simple black embroidered crest appearing on shirts from 1987–90, and an all-white crest on a red-edged black shield for the 1992–99 seasons, but reverted to its original form in 2000.

Shirt sponsors and manufacturers

Ground

Sheffield United play at Bramall Lane, near the centre of Sheffield. Bramall Lane is the oldest major league ground anywhere in the world, having hosted its first game in 1862, a match between Hallam and Sheffield Club. Bramall Lane also hosted the world's first ever floodlit football match on 14 October 1878 with two teams picked from the Sheffield Football Association. The power for the lights was provided by two generators. The crowd was 20,000 and the score 2–0.

Bramall Lane was originally a cricket ground and in 1855 it was leased to Sheffield United Cricket Club (founded in 1854) by the Duke of Norfolk. The ground was opened with a cricket match on 30 April 1855 and later became a shared cricket/football venue. After Yorkshire County Cricket Club was founded in 1863, it was their main venue in the nineteenth century. They continued to use the ground for some matches each season until 7 August 1973, after which construction work began to convert Bramall Lane into a specialist football stadium.

The ground has seen expansion in recent years, with the 2006 completion of a 3,000 seat corner stand, Bramall Lane is now an all-seater stadium fit for the Premier League holding 32,050.

In March 2009 the club were officially granted permission to expand the stadium once again, over two phases. The first phase would have seen the Kop being extended to increase the ground's capacity up to approximately 37,000. It would also have seen the removal of the main supporting pillars and a giant screen installed as part of the stand's roof. The second phase would have seen the Valad Stand (formerly Arnold Laver Stand) also extended, bringing the total capacity to a 40,000 all seater. The expansion would also have had a secondary focus of being available for selection for FIFA World Cup matches in 2018 or 2022, if England's bid were to be successful. However, on 16 December 2009 The Football Association announced that should England's 2018/2022 World Cup bid be successful then any games played in Sheffield would be staged at Sheffield Wednesday's Hillsborough Stadium. In light of this United's former chief executive, Trevor Birch, made it known that all planned ground redevelopment had been put on hold until the club was able to regain and maintain Premiership status.

A revised application for the redevelopment of Kop was submitted in 2015, which would see 3,215 seats added to the stand's current capacity. Further plans were revealed in 2017 for the development of the corner between the Kop and South Stand, which would see the construction of residential flats and a new club store.

Supporters and rivalries

Sheffield United derive support from a broad cross-section of the city and its environs, with branches of the official supporters' club running from Swinton, Kiveton Park, Retford and Eckington. Further afield, supporters groups also exist in Essex, the Republic of Ireland, the Netherlands and Australia, amongst others.

A 2013 study of posts on social networking site Twitter found that Blades fans have the most positive interactions with the official account of their club out of any in English football. Sheffield United were also found to have the most 'obsessed' fans in the 2006–07 Premier League, with supporters reportedly thinking about the team 110 times a day on average.

United have a number of celebrity supporters including:

 Sean Bean, actor
 Kell Brook, boxer
 Richard Caborn, Labour Party politician
 Joe Elliott, singer-songwriter and musician
 Jessica Ennis-Hill, Olympic gold-medallist
 Flea, singer and actor
 Matt Fitzpatrick, golfer
 Mick Foley, author, actor and former professional wrestler
 Paul Goodison, Olympic gold-medallist
 Paul Heaton, musician
Ding Junhui, professional snooker player
 Mark Labbett, Chaser on TV quiz show The Chase
 Michael Palin, writer and television presenter
 Joe Root, England cricketer
 Juan Sebastián Verón, former Argentina international footballer

Rivalries
Sheffield United have numerous rivalries, mostly with other Yorkshire clubs. The most notable rivalry is with their city neighbours Sheffield Wednesday, with whom they contest the Steel City derby (named after the steel industry for which the city of Sheffield is globally famous).

Sheffield United's next main rival is Leeds United from West Yorkshire. This is known as a Yorkshire derby match (the two cities of Sheffield  and Leeds are the largest two cities in Yorkshire). Their other main rivals are the professional clubs of South Yorkshire;  Barnsley, Doncaster Rovers and Rotherham United. These matches are known as South Yorkshire derbies.

Sheffield United also have a rivalry with Nottingham Forest. This can be attributed to the miners' strikes of the 1980s, where workers in the pits of Nottinghamshire did not join the strike (known locally as scabbing) while miners from Yorkshire did.

West Ham United have also become fierce rivals due to the 'Tevez saga' and the following lawsuit charges.

Chants
Like many English clubs, Sheffield United supporters have a wide variety of chants and songs. The most famous of these is The Greasy Chip Butty Song, sung to the tune of John Denver's 'Annie's Song'.

Records and statistics

 Record League victory: 10–0 away v Port Vale, Division Two, 10 December 1892 and 10–0 home v Burnley, Division One, 19 January 1929
 Record Cup victory: 6–0 home v Leyton Orient, FA Cup 1st Round 6 November 2016
 Record League defeat: 3–10 away v Middlesbrough, Division One, 18 November 1933
 Record Cup defeat: 0–13 home v Bolton Wanderers, FA Cup 2nd round, 1 February 1890
 Highest home attendance: 68,287 v Leeds United, FA Cup 5th round, 15 February 1936
 Most league appearances: Joe Shaw made 631 appearances between 1948–1966
 Most goals scored overall: Harry Johnson scored 201 goals in 313 games between 1919–1930
 Most goals scored in a Season: Jimmy Dunne 41 goals from 41 appearances, Division One, 1930–31
 Record Transfer Fee Paid: £23.5 million for Rhian Brewster from Liverpool on 2 October 2020
 Record Transfer Fee Received: £11.5 million for David Brooks to AFC Bournemouth on 1 July 2018

League history

 Seasons spent at Level 1 of the football league system: 62
 Seasons spent at Level 2 of the football league system: 44
 Seasons spent at Level 3 of the football league system: 11
 Seasons spent at Level 4 of the football league system: 1

Players

First team

Out on loan

Player of the year

A 'Player of the Year' award has been presented since 1967 to recognise the player who has made the greatest contribution to the club over the course of the season. Initially organised by the Official Supporters Club the award was voted for by their members although it was presented as an official club award.  In recent years the award has been presented at a gala 'End of Season' award ceremony and dinner, usually held at the end of April, and voting has been widened to include a broader section of the club's fanbase.  The first winner of the award was long serving goalkeeper Alan Hodgkinson. The player with the most award wins is striker Alan Woodward on four occasions between 1970 and 1978.  The longest gap between wins by a player is seven years; Keith Edwards had two spells with the club and won the award during both, in 1977 and 1984. Harry Maguire and Phil Jagielka have won the award on three consecutive occasions. The award was shared between two players for the first time in 2017, with Billy Sharp and John Fleck receiving the award.

Development squads and women’s team

Academy 

Sheffield United's Academy is responsible for youth development at the club. It has produced such players as Manchester City defender Kyle Walker and defender Phil Jagielka, both England internationals, and also Swansea City defender Kyle Naughton, Burnley full back Matthew Lowton, Manchester United defender and club captain Harry Maguire and current club captain Billy Sharp. The Academy building and training facilities in the Sheffield suburb of Shirecliffe were opened in 2002 by then Minister for Sport Richard Caborn. Sheffield United Academy U18s currently play in the Professional Development League at the Shirecliffe ground at Firshill Crescent, and finished as runners-up in the 2011 FA Youth Cup. In addition, SteelPhalt are the sponsor of the Shirecliffe-based Academy, and are also the major sponsor of Sheffield United Women.

Under 23s 
Sheffield United U23s currently compete in the Professional Development League, playing home games at various venues, including Bramall Lane and Stocksbridge Park Steels FC. The club have fielded a reserve team since 1893, when the reserves played in 'Sheffield League Division One'.

United Women 

Sheffield United also have a Women's team, formerly known as Sheffield United Ladies, who play in the FA Women's Championship after having been promoted in the 2017–18 season from the FA Women's National League. Sheffield United Women also have a Development team and numerous junior teams as part of the Regional Talent Club and an additional grassroots arm.

Club management

Coaching staff and support staff

Owners, directors and executives

Managerial history

At its formation in 1889 United did not employ what would today be termed a manager, the side was coached by a trainer and a football committee selected the team and decided upon tactics (this was a continuation of the structure of Sheffield United Cricket Club from which the football team had been formed.) They did appoint Joseph Wostinholm to the position of club secretary and he was responsible for the day-to-day running of the club, matchday organisation and dealing with players and contracts. Wostinholm oversaw a period of rapid growth for the team, culminating in 1899 when United won their one and only First Division championship, after which he retired. Wostinholm was replaced by John Nicholson as secretary and he would remain in post for over 30 years until his death in 1932. Nicholson presided over the most successful period in the club's history as United became a leading force in English football, winning the FA Cup four times and regularly challenged at the top of the league but a second Division One title for the club eluded him.

A new era
Following the death of John Nicholson (who died whilst travelling to an away match in Birmingham) the United board turned to Chesterfield manager Teddy Davison to become the club's first real manager. The team were in decline however and were soon relegated for the first time in their history.  Davison gradually rebuilt the side with astute signings and young players and regained top flight status but the clubs post-war financial problems would hamper team building for years to come.  Davison retired in 1952 and prompted the club to appoint Rotherham United manager Reg Freeman as his successor.  Freeman stabilised the team but fell ill and died in 1955 after which United turned to the inexperienced Joe Mercer but he struggled to cope with a team in decline and departed for Aston Villa in 1958. United then appointed Chester manager John Harris who inherited a talented but under performing side which he transformed into a promotion team, returning to Division One in 1961. Harris built a side based on local players and stabilised them in the top flight but financial issues soon prompted the sale of key players and United were eventually relegated once more. Harris opted to 'move upstairs' to become 'general manager' and handed the role of team manager to Arthur Rowley but he was sacked after one season following disappointing results. Harris returned as manager and guided the side to promotion once more but after a good start back in the top flight Harris' confidence faded and he stepped down in 1973 to 'move upstairs' for the second time.

Rapid decline
Experienced Blackburn Rovers manager Ken Furphy was the man United turned to replace John Harris. He initially did well but the team was ageing and there was little money to replace players.  After a good finish in his first season a disastrous string of results the following year led to Furphy being sacked in October 1975. Jimmy Sirrel was recruited from Notts County but he proved unpopular with both the players and fans and could not halt the decline, overseeing relegation and then being sacked in September 1977 with United at the bottom of Division Two. The ambitious and colourful Harry Haslam was handed the reigns and although many of his ideas were ahead of their time he built an ageing side based on 'star' players at the end of their career. Now in the Third Division performances deteriorated still further and Haslam stepped down due to illness in January 1981. World Cup winner and then United player Martin Peters was promoted to the position of manager but United were relegated to Division Four at the end of the season and Peters resigned.

Moving on up
With a new ambitious board in place United recruited Ian Porterfield as manager in June 1981. He had an immediate impact, winning the Division Four championship in his first season and taking the club back into the second tier two years later on a meagre budget. Despite this many fans were unhappy with the style of football and odd team selections and Porterfield was sacked in 1986 following supporter protests. Coach Billy McEwan was promoted to the position of manager but failed to improve the standard of play and with attendances falling and the team in danger of relegation once more he was sacked in January 1988. United now turned to the colourful character of Dave Bassett who had most recently had a short, unsuccessful spell as manager of Watford. It was to prove an astute appointment as although he could not prevent relegation in his first season he built a solid, hard working team on a small budget and won back to back promotions, returning the club to the top flight and achieving regular mid-table finishes. With the formation of the Premier League United's old financial problems and willingness to sell star players without replacing them meant the side eventually succumbed to relegation and when an immediate return was not forthcoming Basset was sacked in December 1995.

Comings and goings
The following years proved a turbulent time for United as they chased the ambition of Premiership football.  Experienced Howard Kendall was recruited as manager and undertook a complete rebuilding of the side but left in June 1997 to take over at Everton. Player-coach Nigel Spackman was promoted to replace Kendall but after initial promise he quit after only eight months citing boardroom interference. This was to become a recurring theme and replacement Steve Bruce would leave after only one season citing the same reasons. Adrian Heath then proved a disastrous appointment and lasted only six months before being sacked with United looking more likely to be relegated than promoted. The Blades then turned to experienced lower league manager Neil Warnock who managed to stave off relegation and began to rebuild the side on a meagre budget. Warnock proved a divisive figure with fans, but after a number of mid-table finishes he achieved promotion back to the Premiership in 2006. The side were relegated the following season, prompting the board not to renew Warnock's contract.

Just like Adrian Heath, the appointment of Bryan Robson in 2007 proved an unpopular and unsuccessful one and he was sacked after less than a year following poor results and intense fan pressure. Former assistant manager Kevin Blackwell was appointed as Robson's replacement but despite reaching the play-off finals in his first full season the team was obviously in decline and he was sacked after only two games of the 2010–11 season.  Worse was to come however as player-coach Gary Speed was briefly promoted to manager but left after only a few months to take over the Welsh national side. Micky Adams then became the third full-time manager of the season, and oversaw a disastrous run of results which saw United relegated and Adams sacked after only six months in charge.

With United in the third tier once more, Danny Wilson was appointed as manager in June 2011, despite protests from United fans over his previous association with cross-town rivals Sheffield Wednesday. Wilson guided the club to the League One play-off final in his first full season in charge, only to lose to Huddersfield Town after a famous penalty shootout in which Huddersfield missed their first three penalties. Despite the club challenging for promotion the following season, a poor run of results led to Wilson's departure in April 2013, being replaced by Chris Morgan until the end of the season.

After a long search for a new boss, former Scotland defender David Weir was appointed as Wilson's long-term replacement. Weir's tenure was short-lived however, as he was sacked in October of the same year, having won only one of 13 games in charge. After Chris Morgan had overseen the team for a brief time, Nigel Clough was appointed as Weir's permanent successor in October 2013. Clough guided the Blades to finish seventh in the table narrowly missing the play-offs after having been bottom of the table at the start of February and also led United to an FA Cup semi-final against Hull City which the Blades lost 5–3 after twice taking the lead in the first half. The following season saw Clough guide the Blades to fifth place in the league, thus qualifying for the play-offs and also led them to a first League Cup semi-final in 12 years, with the Blades ultimately losing to Tottenham Hotspur 3–2 on aggregate. United failed to gain promotion through the play-offs after losing to Swindon Town 2–1 in the first leg and drawing 5–5 in the second leg (7–6 on aggregate).

Following their failure to gain promotion, Clough was sacked on 25 May 2015 and on 2 June 2015, former Scunthorpe United, Southampton and Reading boss Nigel Adkins was appointed as the new Blades manager. However, his appointment only lasted one season as the Blades (who were in 2nd place after the first five matches) ultimately finished in 11th place, the club's lowest finish in the third tier since 1983.

Adkins was duly sacked on 12 May 2016 and quickly replaced by former Northampton Town manager and former Blades player Chris Wilder, who oversaw United's promotion from League One after six years in the division, and its subsequent return to the Premier League in 2019.

Honours and achievements

Leagues
 First Division / Premier League (Level 1)
 Champions: 1897–98
 Runners-up: 1896–97, 1899–1900
 Second Division / First Division / Championship (Level 2)
 Champions: 1952–53
 2nd place promotion: 1892–93, 1938–39, 1960–61, 1970–71, 1989–90, 2005–06, 2018–19
 Third Division / Second Division / League One (Level 3)
 Champions: 2016–17
 2nd place promotion: 1988–89
 3rd place promotion: 1983–84
 Fourth Division / Third Division / League Two (Level 4)
 Champions: 1981–82
 Football League North
 Champions: 1945–46
Sheffield United are the fourth club to have won a championship title in each of England's four professional leagues. After Burnley, Preston North End and Wolverhampton Wanderers.

Cups

 FA Cup
  Winners: 1898–99, 1901–02, 1914–15, 1924–25
 Runners-up: 1900–01, 1935–36
Sheriff of London Charity Shield
 Winners: 1898 (shared)

In media and popular culture
BBC Radio Sheffield is the current radio broadcaster of live commentaries of matches. Available on DAB, Freeview channel 734, FM frequencies 88.6 MHz, 94.7 MHz, 104.1 MHz & MW frequency of 1035 kHz. All available in South Yorkshire and surrounding areas.

United were, along with Arsenal, the first team to be featured in a live radio commentary. The Division One fixture between the two sides on 22 January 1927 was broadcast by the BBC. Club captain Billy Gillespie scored United's goal in the 1–1 draw and listeners were provided with a numbered map of the pitch via the Radio Times to aid their understanding of where play was taking place. The area in front of the goalkeeper was numbered 1, with the game providing the first use of the phrase "back to square one."

A number of films and television programmes have included references to Sheffield United:

 1977 Sheffield United are referenced by Brian Blessed's character in a third series episode of the BBC post-apocalyptic drama series Survivors from the 1970s. Blessed's character also wears a Sheffield United scarf throughout.
 1990, the BBC produced a six-part documentary series named "United" that followed the fortunes of the club towards the end of the 1989–90 season, in which they achieved automatic promotion to the top flight of English football.
 1996 film When Saturday Comes stars real-life United fan Sean Bean as a part-time Hallam FC player who is scouted by Sheffield United, who then goes on to play in a FA Cup semi-final.
 1997 British comedy film The Full Monty is set in Sheffield and the character 'Gaz''' is seen wearing a replica United shirt at one part of the film, and promises his son a ticket for a game at Bramall Lane between Sheffield United and Manchester United.
 2004 Walt Disney film National Treasure which stars Sean Bean, and Nicolas Cage as the lead character. There is a scene where Bean's character is writing on a yellow notepad. Near the top right corner of the notepad is a doodle of the Sheffield United club emblem, the crossed blades and a dot to represent the Yorkshire rose.  
 2005 film Batman Begins'' features a child wearing a 1990s Blades shirt. 
 2012 television drama Prisoners' Wives also references the club.

International links

In January 2006, Sheffield United became the first foreign club to take over a Chinese team when they purchased the football club Chengdu F.C., based in the city of Chengdu, China. The club was renamed the Chengdu Blades, after their new owners. Sheffield United shirts were sold in China, and Chengdu shirts were sold in Sheffield, increasing revenue streams for both clubs. United sold on their share of the Chinese side in 2010, following Chengdu's implication in a match-fixing scandal and increasing financial pressures on the English club.

In February 2008, Kevin McCabe, the club's chairman, finalised an agreement with Budapest-based Ferencváros to buy its football team, and also negotiated with the Hungarian government to purchase and develop the ground around Stadion Albert Flórián. A match was played in Budapest to celebrate the link-up. McCabe left the Fenecváros board in January 2011.

The Blades also have operating, business and exchange of ideas links with Central Coast Mariners of Australia and White Star Woluwé of Belgium. In November 2020, they took over the Calicut, Kerala based club Quartz FC which plays in the third tier of Indian Football and rebranded it as Kerala United FC.

Affiliated clubs
  Arklow Town
  Beerschot
  Buxton
  Central Coast Mariners
  Estudiantes
  Fenerbahce SK
  São Paulo
  Strindheim IL
  White Star Woluwé
  Kerala United FC
 Al Hilal United (2020–present)
 LB Châteauroux (2021–present)

Bibliography

References

External links

 Official website 

 
1889 establishments in England
Association football clubs established in 1889
United
Football clubs in South Yorkshire
Football clubs in England
Sheffield & Hallamshire County FA members
English Football League clubs
EFL Championship clubs
Premier League clubs
FA Cup winners